Janet Vestal Kelly (born February 16, 1976) is a former Secretary of the Commonwealth of Virginia, serving from 2010 through 2014 as part of the cabinet of Governor Bob McDonnell. She previously served as Chief Operations Officer of McDonnell's gubernatorial campaign and on his staff in the Attorney General's office. During McDonnell's federal corruption trial, Kelly served as a key witness for the defense.

Kelly currently serves as Principal & Director of Government Relations for America's Kids Belong, as well as President of Virginia's Kids Belong, organizations devoted to uniting government, faith-based, creative, and business sectors to end the foster care & adoption crisis in the US.

References

External links

1976 births
Living people
Secretaries of the Commonwealth of Virginia
State cabinet secretaries of Virginia
Virginia Republicans
Women in Virginia politics
Liberty University alumni
21st-century American politicians
21st-century American women politicians
Place of birth missing (living people)